Fosha may be:
 a diminutive form of the name Agafon
 a surname:
 Diana Fosha, American psychologist

See also 
 Foixà, pronounced "fosha" in Catalan, a village in Catalonia, Spain